Stockholm, Royal Library, manuscript X. 90 (also known as Kungliga Bibliotek, handskrift X. 90 or 10. 90) is an early fifteenth-century manuscript noted for the Middle English medical texts that it contains.

Origins and provenance 
The quarto manuscript is made almost entirely of 'greyish and thick' paper, but pages 7–10 are made of two folios of vellum, while pages 94–104 are dyed red. The codex seems to have been composed in the first quarter of the fifteenth century, and exhibits four hands (of which the first and fourth contributed most of the material). Mention of Frawsham Halle on p. 49 associates the production of the manuscript with Fransham in Norfolk. Dialectal analysis using the Linguistic Atlas of Late Mediaeval English supports the idea that the manuscript was a Norfolk production, though the texts it contains at least sometimes originated elsewhere. The final leaves of the manuscript have been lost.

The manuscript is thought to have been donated to Stockholm's royal library by Christianus Ravius, who spent time in Oxford, and served as Sweden's Royal Librarian 1655–59;  the volume was accessioned in 1706.

Contents and editions 

Irma Taavitsainen summarised the English contents of the manuscript in the Index of Middle English Prose as follows(with additional information added from other sources): 

The distribution of scribal activity in the manuscript is as follows:

A selection of the prose texts from the manuscript was published by Ferdinand Holthausen in 1897. Though superseded by other editions, Holthausen's selection remains in use as a convenient sample of Middle English medical recipes; he printed samples from pages 14, 26, 31, 33, 34, 35, 47, 85, 103, 104, 110, 117, 120, 121, 129, 136-37, 145, and 155.

References 

Medical manuals
Middle English literature
English manuscripts
History of medieval medicine
Science and technology in Norfolk
History of Norfolk